Manik is a Bengali movie released in 2005. Directed by  Probhat Roy,  the movie featured Jeet, Koel Mallick, Ranjit Mallick. This movie is Koel Mallick's second.
 This film was shot at Kalimpong Golf Course.

Plot
Samir Mitra is an unemployed educated man who is looking for a job. His father Abir Mitra is a retired person. Samir's mother is suffering from cancer. One day Samir suddenly meets Manik Chandra Sadhukhan. Manik's father is Niranjan Sadhukan, he is also ill. Latika is Manik's younger sister. Manik has come to Kolkata to meet his father's friend Chandrakanta Majumadar who is an established businessman. Manik meets with an accident on the way. Samir tries to save his life. Before his death Manik requests Samir to take care of his father and younger sister; he also tells Samir not to disclose the news of his accident. Manik gives Samir all the required information. Samir becomes Manik; he meets Chandrakanta as Manik. Chandrakanta appoints him in his own office. Samir meets Chandrakanta's daughter Ria and wife Manju, Ria and Samir gradually fall in love but Samir feels uncomfortable whenever he thinks that when everybody discovers that he is not Manik then what will happen. From his salary he maintains his own family and Manik's family. Everybody is impressed with his behavior and honesty. Suddenly Niranjan and Latika come to Kolkata because Niranjan is unwell. Niranjan has lost his eyesight and there is a problem in his heart also. Samir tries to hide from Niranjan but everybody learns the truth. Kartik Sen, the business rival of Chandrakanta, kidnaps Ria and demands ransom. Samir and Chandrakanta rescue her with the help of police. Samir donates his father's eye to Niranjan. Niranjan recovers his eyesight.

Cast
 Jeet as Samir Mitra, who disguised himself as Manik
 Ranjit Mullick as Chandrakanto Majumdar
 Koel Mullick as Riya Majumdar
 Samata Das as Latika, Manik's sister
 Monu Mukherjee as Abir Mitra, Samir's father
 Soma Dey as Manju Majumdar, Riya's mother
 Debdoot Ghosh as Manik Chandra Sadhukhan, a poor village boy from Medinipur
 Rajatava Dutta as Samir's college friend Anwar, a taxi driver
 Shyamal Dutta as Niranjan Sadhukhan, Manik's blind father
 Shantilal Mukherjee as Shiben, flat contractor
 Sagnik Chatterjee as Pratik Sen
 Biplab Chatterjee as Kartik Sen
 Alakananda Ray as Samir's mother
 Rajesh Sharma as Shambhu, Kartik Sen's henchman

Soundtrack 

Singers are Babul Supriyo, Shreya Ghoshal, Jojo, Reema Mukherjee

Awards
Awarded by ETV Lux Best Film in 2005
Awards   :Lux ETV Award as the Best Film in the year 2005. Won five awards.
 Anandalok Awards  (2005)
 Best Actor: Jeet
 Best Playback Singer (Female) :Shreya Ghoshal

References

External links
www.telegraphindia.com preview

2005 films
2000s Bengali-language films
Bengali-language Indian films
2005 romantic comedy-drama films
Indian romantic comedy-drama films
Films directed by Prabhat Roy
Films scored by Babul Bose